Beaumont may refer to:

Places

Canada 
 Beaumont, Alberta
 Beaumont, Quebec

England 
 Beaumont, Cumbria
 Beaumont, Essex
Beaumont Cut, a canal closed in the 1930s
 Beaumont Street, Oxford

France (communes) 
 Beaumont, Ardèche
 Beaumont, Corrèze
 Beaumont, Gers
 Beaumont, Haute-Loire
 Beaumont, Meurthe-et-Moselle
 Beaumont, Puy-de-Dôme
 Beaumont, Haute-Savoie
 Beaumont, Vienne
 Beaumont, Yonne
 Beaumont-en-Diois

United States 
 Beaumont, California
 Beaumont, Kansas
 Beaumont, Mississippi
 Beaumont Scout Reservation, High Ridge, Missouri
 Beaumont, Ohio
 Beaumont, Texas
 Beaumont (Amtrak station)
 Beaumont, Wisconsin

Elsewhere 
 Beaumont, South Australia, a suburb of Adelaide
 Beaumont, Belgium, in the province of Hainaut, Wallonia
 Beaumont, Grand'Anse, commune in Haiti
 Beaumont City the principal city of the Beaumont, Grand'Anse commune
 Beaumont, Dublin, a suburb of Dublin, Ireland
 Beaumont, New Zealand, a township in Otago
 Beaumont Island (Greenland)
 Beaumont (crater), a lunar crater

People 
 Beaumont (surname)
 Beaumont (given name)
 House of Beaumont, an Anglo-Norman baronial family in England

Titles 
 Duc de Beaumont, an extinct French title
 Viscount Beaumont of Swords, an extinct title in the Peerage of Ireland
 Baron Beaumont, in the Peerage of England
 Beaumont baronets, in the Baronetage of England

Buildings 
 Beaumont Palace, Oxford, England
 Beaumont House, Beaumont, Australia
 Beaumont Tower, East Lansing, Michigan, U.S., on the campus of Michigan State University
 Beaumont (Michaux, Virginia), U.S., a historic house

Hospitals 
 Beaumont Hospital, Dublin, Ireland
 William Beaumont Army Medical Center, El Paso, Texas, US
 Beaumont Hospital, Grosse Pointe, Michigan, US
 Beaumont Hospital, Royal Oak, Michigan, US
 Beaumont Hospital, Troy, Michigan, US

Schools 
 Beaumont College, a Roman Catholic public school, now closed, in Old Windsor, Berkshire, England
 Beaumont School (St Albans), a mixed school in St Albans, Hertfordshire, England
 Beaumont High School (disambiguation), various schools in the United States and Canada

Battles 
 Battle of Beaumont (1870), Franco-Prussian War
 Battle of Beaumont (1794), French Revolutionary War

Arts and entertainment 
 Beaumont, British band formed by Keith Girdler and Paul Stewart of Blueboy
 Beaumont, a song from 3OH!3's third album Streets of Gold

Other uses 
 Beaumont (automobile), a make of automobile produced by General Motors of Canada

See also 
 Beaumont-cum-Moze, Essex
 Beaumont-de-Lomagne, Tarn-et-Garonne
 Beaumont-du-Ventoux, Vaucluse
 Beaumont-en-Auge, Calvados
 Beaumont-en-Cambrésis, Nord
 Beaumont-Hague, in Manche
 Beaumont-Hamel, Somme
 Beaumont-le-Roger, Eure
 Beaumont-sur-Oise, Val-d'Oise
 Beaumont-sur-Sarthe, Sarthe
 Bomont, West Virginia